The Irish Institute is a Catholic private school in Greater Mexico City. Operated by the Legionaries of Christ, the grounds, located in Naucalpan, State of Mexico, have separate areas for boys and girls, plus a third one for the coed preschool. The school levels in total range from preschool to bachillerato, equivalent to the American K-12. 

The Irish Institute is also present in other cities of Mexico, including: Nuevo Laredo and Monterrey.

Students
Jason Berry and Gerald Renner, the authors of the 2004 book Vows of Silence: The Abuse of Power in the Papacy of John Paul II, said that the students came from the "superrich of Mexico City". Paul Lennon, a former member of the Legionaries quoted in the book, wrote that "The family names [of the students] were like a Who's Who of Mexican people." Historically many students arrived in cars driven by bodyguards for protection against kidnapping.

References

External links
 Irish Institute 

Irish Mexican
Catholic schools in Mexico
High schools in the State of Mexico